Cerace loxodes is a species of moth of the family Tortricidae. It is found in Tenasserim, India.

The wingspan is about 52 mm. The forewings are dark coppery purple fuscous with an orange-red apical blotch and numerous ochreous-white dots and round spots. The hindwings are orange with a dark purple-fuscous blotch.

References

Moths described in 1912
Ceracini